Huanghetitan (meaning "Yellow River titan"), is a genus of sauropod dinosaur from the early Cretaceous Period. It was a basal titanosauriform which lived in what is now Gansu, China.

History 
 
The type species, Huanghetitan liujiaxiaensis, was described by You et al. in 2006. It is known from fragmentary materials including two caudal vertebrae, an almost complete sacrum, rib fragments, and the left shoulder girdle, and was discovered in the eastern part of the Lanzhou Basin (Hekou Group) in the Gansu Province in 2004.

A second species, H. ruyangensis, was described in 2007 from the Aptian-Albian Haoling Formation of Ruyang County, China (Henan Province). A recent cladistic analysis has found that this species is unlikely to be closely related to H. liujiaxiaensis and requires a new genus name.

Description 
H. ruyangensis is known from a partial vertebral column and several ribs, the size of which (the largest approaches 3 m (10 ft)) indicate it had among the deepest body cavities of any known dinosaur. This second species, along with its local relatives Daxiatitan and Ruyangosaurus, is one of the biggest dinosaurs ever found in Asia, and possibly one of the largest in the world. In 2019 Gregory S. Paul suggested that the dorsal rib of Huanghetitan ruyangensis is about the same length as Patagotitan's, and its sacrum may be similar in length, possibly suggesting a similar mass range of 45–55 tonnes (49.6–60.6 short tons).

In 2007, Lü Junchang et al. created a new family for Huanghetitan, the Huangetitanidae, but this family found to be polyphyletic by Mannion et al.

The following is a cladogram from Averianov et al., 2017, based on the work of Mannion et al., showing Huanghetitan as a paraphyletic genus with "H." ruyangensis being closer to Titanosauria:

References

External links
 Dinosaur Mailing List entry which announces the discovery
 Mounted skeleton of the type species Huanghetitan liujiaxiaensis
 Shoulder and hip material from Huanghetitan liujiaxiaensis
 New mounted skeleton of the second and larger species, Huanghetitan ruyangensis

Titanosaurs
Albian life
Aptian life
Early Cretaceous dinosaurs of Asia
Cretaceous China
Fossils of China
Paleontology in Gansu
Fossil taxa described in 2006